Providence Christian School may refer to:

Providence School, Jacksonville, Florida

Providence Christian School, Brandon, Florida
Providence Christian School (Oxford, Georgia)
Providence Christian School (Kalamazoo), Michigan
Providence Christian School (Charlotte), North Carolina
Providence Hall Classical Christian School, Oklahoma City, Oklahoma
Providence Christian School, Dothan, Alabama

See also
Providence High School (disambiguation)
Providence Christian Academy (disambiguation)